Arab–Israeli relations refers to relations between Israel and the multiple Arab nations who have begun full diplomatic relations with Israel. 

Arab countries that have full diplomatic relations with Israel include:

 Egypt
 Jordan
 UAE
 Bahrain
 Morocco

History

2016–present

Israel–United Arab Emirates relations
The Israel–United Arab Emirates normalization agreement officially the Abraham Accords Peace Agreement: Treaty of Peace, Diplomatic Relations and Full Normalization Between the United Arab Emirates and the State of Israel, was initially agreed to in a joint statement by the United States, Israel and the United Arab Emirates (UAE) on August 13, 2020, officially referred to as the Abraham Accords. The UAE thus became the third Arab country, after Egypt in 1979 and Jordan in 1994, to agree to formally normalize its relationship with Israel, as well as the first Persian Gulf country to do so. Concurrently, Israel agreed to suspend plans for annexing parts of the West Bank. The agreement normalized what had long been informal but robust foreign relations between the two countries. The agreement was signed at the White House on September 15, 2020. It was approved unanimously by the Israeli cabinet on October 12 and was ratified by the Knesset on October 15. The UAE parliament and cabinet ratified the agreement on October 19.

On August 16, 2019, Israel's foreign minister Israel Katz made a public declaration about military cooperation with the UAE amidst rising tensions with Iran. Also, on the same day, the UAE for the first time established telephone links to Israel by unblocking direct dialling to Israel's +972 country code. 

The first direct commercial flight from Israel to the UAE took place on August 31, 2020, and the first ship carrying cargo from the United Arab Emirates to Israel entered the Port of Haifa on October 12.

See also
 Arab League
 Arab League and the Arab–Israeli conflict
 Foreign relations of the Arab League 
 Foreign relations of Israel

Notes

References

External links

Full text of the Israel–United Arab Emirates agreement
Video of the event: Abraham Accords agreement between UAE, Bahrain and Israel, The Hill (YouTube)

Foreign relations of Israel
Foreign relations of the Arab League
Arab–Israeli peace process
Middle East peace efforts